Nothing New is a posthumous album of vocal & piano recordings by Gil Scott-Heron released by XL Recordings on April 19, 2014 in conjunction with Record Store Day. The album consists of new, stripped-down versions of a selection of older Scott-Heron songs stretching from 1971's "Pieces of a Man" to 1994's "The Other Side". It was recorded with producer Richard Russell between 2005 and 2009, in the same sessions that led to 2010's I'm New Here.

In the liner notes published on the official website, Russell describes the album as, "carefully curated (and) an excellent introduction to his previous output," adding that, "the album is utterly sparse and devoid of anything that is not completely necessary. All it contains is Gil's singing and piano playing."

On April 1, 2015, the album was released digitally alongside a documentary named Who Is Gil Scott-Heron?.

Track listing
All lyrics are written by Gil Scott-Heron; all music is composed by Gil Scott-Heron, except for "Pieces of a Man"; co-composed by Brian Jackson.

Charts

References

External links
 Gil Scott-Heron official website with release info

2014 albums
Gil Scott-Heron albums
XL Recordings albums
Albums published posthumously